Aethes acerba is a species of moth of the family Tortricidae. It is found in Henan, China.

The wingspan is 13.5−14 mm. The ground colour of the forewings is yellowish white, sparsely mixed with small brown spots at the costal margin. The hindwings are grey.

Etymology
The species name refers to the aculeate distal one-fourth of the phallus and is derived from the Latin acerbus (meaning aculeate or having prickles or sharp points).

References

Moths described in 2013
acerba
Moths of Asia
Endemic fauna of China